Mijek (also transliterated "Mijik", "Miyek" or "Miyec") is a small town in the Río de Oro region of Western Sahara. It is located east of the Moroccan Wall, in the Liberated Territories (controlled by the Polisario Front and administered by the Sahrawi Republic), 80 km north of the Mauritanian town of Zouérat and 250 km. east of Dakhla. It has a hospital, and reportedly a school will be opened during the 2012–2013 academic year. It is the head of the 3rd military region of the Sahrawi Arab Democratic Republic.

History
The surroundings were the scene of several battles between Sahrawi tribes and the French Army (Battle of Teniamun in late 1931, Battle of Miyec in early 1932).

Politics
On 20 May 2007, the Polisario Front celebrated in Mijek the 34th anniversary of the beginning of its armed struggle. It also hosted the annual conference of the Sahrawi communities abroad (Sahrawi diaspora).

On 12 October 2010, the village hosted the 35th anniversary of the "Day of National Unity", commemorating the Ain Ben Tili conference of 1975, as well as the Sahrawi diaspora conference.

International relations

Twin towns and sister cities
Mijek is twinned with:

Ivry-sur-Seine, Val-de-Marne, France (2022)
Coslada, Madrid, Spain
Elorrio, Biscay, Basque Country, Spain
Incisa in Val d'Arno, Florence, Tuscany, Italy
Llanera, Asturias, Spain (since 1996)
Marciana Marina, Livorno, Tuscany, Italy
Mundaka, Biscay, Basque Country, Spain
Ormaiztegi, Gipuzkoa, Basque Country, Spain
Oyón-Oion, Álava, Basque Country, Spain
Peligros, Granada, Andalucía, Spain
Poggibonsi, Siena, Tuscany, Italy
Ponte Buggianese, Pistoia, Tuscany, Italy (since 27 January 1996)
Ugao-Miraballes, Biscay, Basque Country, Spain
Vaiano, Prato, Tuscany, Italy

References

Populated places in Western Sahara
Sahrawi Arab Democratic Republic
Populated places in Oued Ed-Dahab Province
Rural communes of Dakhla-Oued Ed-Dahab